Cheyenne, formerly known as PlayStation is a large catamaran created for the 2000 around the world race known as The Race. Like its competitors, Cheyenne was created for sheer speed, pushing the state of the art in materials, construction, and operation. PlayStation was skippered and owned by Steve Fossett. It is owned by and operated by Virgin Oceanic's co-founder Chris Welsh.

Career
Construction of the boat was by Mick Cookson of Cookson Boatworks in Auckland, New Zealand in 1998 to 1999. The boats construction was made from pre-preg carbon fiber laminates in various orientations, with a 38 mm aluminum honeycomb core.

After breaking the 24-hour distance record (583 NM), PlayStation suffered a fire while being prepared to be shipped to the US. The cause of the fire was the over-charging of the NiMH batteries, and the damage from the fire required that 26' of the starboard hull be replaced. A portion of the hull was created at the builders which was grafted to the original bow and stern leaving virtually no evidence of the fire.

At  PlayStation was overpowered and the possibility of a pitch pole in a yacht this size warranted the refit. The boat carries  of sail upwind, and a total of  downwind from her 147.5 foot carbon mast.

In The Race, PlayStation suffered mechanical failures from the start and withdrew from the competition on Day 16.

In 2001 Fossett and his crew crossed the Atlantic Ocean in 4 days and 17 hours establishing a new world record for crossing the Atlantic Ocean on a sail vessel.

In 2006, Cheyenne's mast broke due to severe weather off the coast of Argentina. Cheyenne was converted to a power catamaran and underwent significant changes and became the mothership for Virgin Oceanic's deep sea exploration mission called 5 Dives.

In 2009 Cheyenne was purchased by Chris Welsh from the estate of Steve Fossett. Plans are to launch a deep sea submarine to carry passengers to extreme ocean depths. The deep sea adventure will be supported by Cheyenne, and will use the HOT DeepFlight Challenger sub to plumb the depths of the world's oceans to full depth. Both of these were owned by Steve Fossett, who had modified the racing catamaran to become the mothership to his oceanic dive record attempt. The submarine seats one person, and is currently the only crewed submersible capable of reaching the deepest part of the oceans. As at 2014 the deep sea expedition supporting bey Cheyenne was still in the process of being planned.

Records
 The round the world sailing record of 58 days 9 hours 32 minutes and 45 seconds in 2004.  PlayStation was renamed Cheyenne in 2003, prior to setting this record.

The former records have all been broken.

See also
 List of large sailing yachts

References

External links
 Adventure of a Lifetime - A talk by Chuck Hawley, who sailed on the PlayStation
 The Steve Fossett Challenge
 Morelli & Melvin Design & Engineering
 Steve Fosset's PlayStation article from Latitude 38 magazine

Individual sailing vessels
Individual catamarans
1990s sailing yachts
Sailing yachts built in New Zealand
The Race yachts
Oryx Quest yachts